Loch Anna is a small, upland, freshwater loch approximately  north of Loch Alsh at Ardelve, in Lochalsh, Scotland. It was surveyed in 1904 by James Murray as part of Sir John Murray's Bathymetrical Survey of Fresh-Water Lochs of Scotland 1897-1909.

References 

Anna
Anna